Uchinomi Dam (Re)  is a gravity dam located in Kagawa Prefecture in Japan. The dam is used for flood control and water supply. The catchment area of the dam is 4.8 km2. The dam impounds about 8  ha of land when full and can store 1060 thousand cubic meters of water. The construction of the dam was started on 1997 and completed in 2013.

See also
List of dams in Japan

References

Dams in Kagawa Prefecture